
George Washington Kirk was a soldier who served in American Civil War. Born and raised in Tennessee, he married Maria Louisa Jones in 1860. At the start of the war he served in the Confederate States Army, but his views were Unionist and he left the state to join the Union Army. Advancing to the rank of colonel, in 1864 he raised the 3rd North Carolina Mounted Infantry (Union) and led many raids into North Carolina. Because of the regiment's guerrilla-like tactics, the regiment became known as Kirk's Raiders.

In 1870, Kirk was tasked by North Carolina Governor William Woods Holden to raise and lead a militia into Alamance and Caswell counties to quell the Ku Klux Klan. Though he was successful in breaking up Klan activity, none of the 100 men he arrested were charged by local authorities. In addition, the action led to Kirk's own arrest, and the impeachment of Governor Holden. With the help of the United States Marshal, Kirk was able to escape from jail, and later was given a position as a police officer with the capital force in Washington, D.C.

In 1890, it was reported that "several very rich finds" of gold, in the Maryland hills near the Potomac River, were discovered, and "being worked", on Kirk's land.

See also
Irene Triplett

References

Bibliography
Bumgarner, Matthew. 2000. Kirk's Raiders; A Notorious Band of Scoundrels and Thieves. Piedmont Press, LLC.

Citations and Notes

1837 births
1905 deaths
19th-century American military personnel
Burials in California
People of Tennessee in the American Civil War
Southern Unionists in the American Civil War